The 1970 Cork Senior Football Championship was the 82nd staging of the Cork Senior Football Championship since its establishment by the Cork County Board in 1887. The draw for the opening round fixtures took place on 25 January 1970. The championship began on 12 April 1970 and ended on 18 October 1970.

University College Cork entered the championship as the defending champions, however, they were beaten by St. Nicholas' in a first round replay.

The final was played on 18 October 1970 at the Athletic Grounds in Cork between Muskerry and Nemo Rangers in what was their first ever meeting in the final. Muskerry won the match by 3-10 to 4-06 to claim their first ever championship title. It remains their only championship title.

Muskerry's Noel Dunne was the championship's top scorer with 1-25.

Team changes

To Championship

Promoted from the Cork Intermediate Football Championship
 St Michael's

Results

First round

Second round

Quarter-finals

Semi-finals

Final

Championship statistics

Top scorers

Top scorers overall

Top scorers in a single game

Miscellaneous

 Muskerry win their and to date only title.
 Muskerry miss out on the double after losing out in the hurling final.
 Nemo Rangers qualify for the final for the first time.

References

Cork Senior Football Championship